Restless Wives is a lost 1924 American silent melodrama film directed by Gregory La Cava. A vintage movie trailer displaying short clips of the film still exists.

Plot
Polly is a wealthy wife neglected by her husband James Benson. When a business engagement causes James to miss their wedding anniversary, Polly goes with admirer Curtis Wilbur to a cabaret, and later she decides to go live with her father. James, who is desperate for reconciliation, kidnaps Polly while she's with Wilbur and takes her to his lodge in the mountains. James is shot by a drunken servant and when he falls, he knocks over a lamp and sets the place on fire. Polly drags him out of the lodge to safety, and the couple is reunited.

Cast

References

External links

1924 films
American black-and-white films
1924 drama films
Films directed by Gregory La Cava
American silent feature films
Silent American drama films
Lost American films
Melodrama films
1924 lost films
Lost drama films
1920s American films